Sinea rileyi is a species of assassin bug in the family Reduviidae. It is found in Europe and Northern Asia (excluding China) and North America.

References

Further reading

 

Reduviidae
Articles created by Qbugbot
Insects described in 1893